I Am Looking for a Man is a 1966 West German romantic comedy film directed by Alfred Weidenmann and starring Ghita Nørby, Walter Giller and Brigitte Horney.

Cast
 Ghita Nørby as Barbara Schönfelder
 Walter Giller as Dr. Pleskau
 Brigitte Horney as Helene Schmidt
 Harald Leipnitz as Gregor
 Monika Dahlberg as Ursula Bode
 Stefan Wigger as Albert Bode
 Sieghardt Rupp as Direktor Voss
 Gerd Baltus as Studientrat Benzinger
 Jean Valmont as Hans Peteer Winkler
 Adeline Wagner as Helga Voss
 Rudolf Rhomberg as Hoteldirektor Bock
 Georg Thomalla as Astrologe Neumann
 Balduin Baas as Artist Pauli
 Hans Putz as Bauunternehmer Märtens
 Claus Ringer as Student Erich
 Paul Hubschmid as Baron Federsen

References

Bibliography 
 James Robert Parish. Film Actors Guide. Scarecrow Press, 1977.

External links 
 

1966 films
1966 romantic comedy films
German romantic comedy films
West German films
1960s German-language films
Films directed by Alfred Weidenmann
1960s German films